Konoyo is the ninth studio album by Canadian electronic music musician Tim Hecker, released on September 28, 2018 on Kranky and Sunblind Music. A majority of the album was made from Hecker's visits to Japan, where he worked with a gagaku ensemble, Tokyo Gakuso, in Jiunzan Mandala-Temple Kanzouin on the outskirts of Tokyo.

Critical reception

Konoyo received critical acclaim upon its release. At Metacritic, which assigns a normalized rating out of 100 to reviews from mainstream critics, the album has received an average score of 82, based on 18 reviews, indicating "universal acclaim".

Accolades

Track listing

Notes
 All tracks are stylized in sentence case, except for "In Death Valley" and "Across to Anoyo". For example, "This Life" is stylized as "This life".

Personnel
 Mariel Roberts – cello
 Tim Hecker – computer, electric guitar, synth, writer, producer
 Kara-Lis Coverdale – keyboards
 Yoshiyuki Izaki - percussion (uchimono)
 Takuya Koketsu - woodwind (ryuteki)
 Motonori Miura - woodwind (hichiriki)
 Fumiya Otonashi - shō
 Jake Viator - transfer
 Akihiro Iizuka – engineer
 Ben Frost – engineer
 Toshihiko Kasai – engineer
 Teo Schifferli – design, layout
 Tobias Spichtig – artwork, photography

References 

2018 albums
Kranky albums
Tim Hecker albums
Sound collage albums